Amr Marey (born 1 April 1992), also transliterated Mareï or Marie, is an Egyptian footballer who plays for Egyptian Premier League side Tala'ea El Gaish on loan from Pyramids and the Egyptian national team as a forward.

Career
Marey started his career with El Mansoura, then he played for Wadi Degla, El Dakhleya and ENPPI, before joining Étoile du Sahel in Tunisia. In 2019, he returned to Egypt to join Pyramids, where he was loaned out to Misr Lel-Makkasa and Tala'ea El Gaish.

References

1992 births
Living people
People from Dakahlia Governorate
Egyptian footballers
Association football forwards
Egyptian Premier League players
Tunisian Ligue Professionnelle 1 players
Egyptian expatriate footballers
Expatriate footballers in Tunisia
Wadi Degla SC players
El Dakhleya SC players
ENPPI SC players
Étoile Sportive du Sahel players
Pyramids FC players
Misr Lel Makkasa SC players
Tala'ea El Gaish SC players
Egyptian expatriate sportspeople in Tunisia